The Military ranks of the Albanian Kingdom were the military ranks used by the Royal Albanian Army. Throughout its short history, the Albanian Kingdom had two ranks systems. The first rank system lasting from 1929 till 1936, with the second lasting till the end of the kingdom in 1939.

Ranks (1929–1936) 
Officers

Other ranks

Ranks (1936–1939) 
Officers

Other ranks

References

External links
 

Albanian Kingdom
Royal Albanian Army